The Kafr Elle Zayat fuel truck explosion occurred on 10 December 2013 when a truck exploded. The blast killed at least 14 people and another six were wounded in Kafr El Zayat, Egypt.

References

Explosions in 2013
2013 in Egypt
2013 road incidents
December 2013 events in Africa